Todd Nelson (born May 15, 1969) is a Canadian ice hockey coach and former professional player. He is currently serving as the head coach of the Hershey Bears of the American Hockey League (AHL). He played 3 games in the National Hockey League with the Pittsburgh Penguins and Washington Capitals between 1991 and 1994. The rest of his playing career, which lasted from 1990 to 2002, was mainly spent in the minor leagues.

Playing career
Originally drafted by the Pittsburgh Penguins in the 1989 NHL Entry Draft, Nelson played primarily in the minors and played just one game for the Penguins. Signed as a free agent by the Washington Capitals, he helped guide the Capitals' minor league affiliate Portland Pirates to the Calder Cup in 1994. He was inducted into the Pirates Hall of Fame in 2007. Nelson played in just two games for the Washington Capitals, and played in the minors until his retirement in 2002.

Coaching career
Following his professional hockey career, Nelson moved into coaching. He was first the assistant coach/player coach for the Muskegon Fury of the UHL for the 2001–02 season. He was then an assistant coach for the Grand Rapids Griffins of the AHL for the 2002–03 season before returning as head coach of the Muskegon Fury from 2003 to 2006. The Fury won the Colonial Cup his first two years as their coach. He moved on to be the assistant coach for the Chicago Wolves of the AHL from 2006 to 2008, who won the Calder Cup in his final season as an assistant.

On July 25, 2008, he accepted an assistant coaching position with the Atlanta Thrashers of the NHL.

On July 15, 2010, he was introduced as the first head coach of the AHL's Oklahoma City Barons, affiliate of the NHL's Edmonton Oilers.

After the firing of Dallas Eakins on December 15, 2014, Nelson was promoted to head coach of the Oilers on an interim basis for the remainder of the 2014–15 NHL season.  He was replaced as head coach by Todd McLellan on May 19, 2015.

On June 16, 2015, Nelson was named the head coach of the Grand Rapids Griffins of the American Hockey League (AHL). Nelson became the third person ever to win the Calder Cup as a player (1994), assistant coach (2008), and head coach (2017), joining Bob Woods and Mike Stothers.

On May 31, 2018, Nelson left the Griffins to become an assistant coach with the Dallas Stars in the NHL until his resignation on May 20, 2022.

On August 11, 2022, Nelson was named the head coach of the Hershey Bears. He is the 28th head coach in team history.

Personal life
Nelson is the older brother of Jeff Nelson and Kerri Nelson-Brunen, and is the father of Colton Nelson, former Division III hockey player at the University of Wisconsin-Superior.

Career statistics

Regular season and playoffs

Coaching record

NHL

Minor leagues

Awards
WHL East Second All-Star Team (1989, 1990)

References

External links
 

1969 births
Living people
Atlanta Thrashers coaches
Berlin Capitals players
Canadian expatriate ice hockey players in Germany
Canadian ice hockey coaches
Canadian ice hockey defencemen
Cleveland Lumberjacks players
Dallas Stars coaches
Edmonton Oilers coaches
Grand Rapids Griffins coaches
Grand Rapids Griffins players
Hershey Bears players
Ice hockey people from Saskatchewan
Pittsburgh Penguins draft picks
Pittsburgh Penguins players
Prince Albert Raiders players
Portland Pirates players
Sportspeople from Prince Albert, Saskatchewan
Washington Capitals players